Mysticoncha is a genus of small sea snails that resemble sea slugs, marine gastropod molluscs in the family Velutinidae.

Species
Species within the genus Mysticoncha include:
 Mysticoncha harrisonae Powell, 1946
 Mysticoncha wilsonae (E. A. Smith, 1886)

References

 Powell A. W. B., New Zealand Mollusca, William Collins Publishers Ltd, Auckland, New Zealand 1979

External links
 Allan J.K. (1936). Mysticoncha, a new generic name for Caledoniella Basedow, non Souverbie. Records of the Australian Museum. 19(6): 391–396, pls 25-26.

Velutinidae